Alphonse-Télesphore Lépine (15 May 1855 – 19 August 1943) was a Canadian journalist, printer and political figure in Quebec. He represented Montreal East in the House of Commons of Canada from 1888 to 1896 as an Independent Conservative member. His name also appears as Alphonse-Télesphore Legris dit Lépine in some sources.

He was born in Quebec City, Canada East, the son of Charles Lépine and Eleonore Lessard. In 1883, he married Alexandrine Scott. Lépine was sub-editor for the Quotidien de Levis. He owned a printing business in Montreal. He was first elected to the House of Commons in an 1888 by-election held after the death of Charles-Joseph Coursol. He was a member of the Knights of Labour and secretary of the Montreal Trades and Labour Council. Lépine was an unsuccessful candidate in the federal riding of St. Mary in 1896.

A park in Montreal was named in his honour.

References 

The Canadian parliamentary companion, 1891 AJ Gemmill
Marc-André Gagnon, "'J'entends parler de leurs intérêts les plus chers': Alphonse-Télesphore Lépine et l'engagement électoral des Chevaliers du travail à Montréal (1888-1896)," Labour/Le Travail 78 (automne 2016), 11–38.http://www.lltjournal.ca/index.php/llt/article/view/5836

1855 births
1943 deaths
Trade unionists from Quebec
Members of the House of Commons of Canada from Quebec
Journalists from Quebec
Canadian printers
Politicians from Quebec City
Knights of Labor people